Knights Hill or Knight's Hill could refer to:

Knights Hill (New South Wales), Australia
Knight's Hill, Tulse Hill, northernmost of two hills in Lambeth, London and former exclave of Streatham
Knight's Hill, West Norwood, road and southernmost of two hills in Lambeth, London
Knight's Hill (ward), an electoral ward in Lambeth, London